is a 1999 Japanese fantasy romance film directed by Yōjirō Takita, starring Ryōko Hirosue, Kaoru Kobayashi and Kayoko Kishimoto and based on the novel Naoko by Keigo Higashino. It was released on 25 September 1999. An English-language French remake, The Secret, was released in 2007.

Cast
Ryōko Hirosue
Kaoru Kobayashi
Kayoko Kishimoto
Ken Kaneko
Yuriko Ishida
Hideaki Itō

Reception
It was chosen as the runner-up in the Best 10 films at the 21st Yokohama Film Festival.

References

External links

1990s romantic fantasy films
Films based on Japanese novels
Films based on works by Keigo Higashino
Films directed by Yōjirō Takita
Japanese romantic fantasy films
1990s Japanese films